Franz Lederer (born 25 November 1963) is an Austrian football manager who most recently managed SV Mattersburg.

References

1963 births
Living people
Austrian football managers
SV Mattersburg managers